Italian Renewal (RI) was a centrist and liberal political party in Italy.

The party was a member of The Olive Tree and centre-left coalition, while also affiliated to the European People's Party from 1998 to 2004.

History
Originally the Dini List – Italian Renewal (Lista Dini – Rinnovamento Italiano), the party was founded in 1996 by Lamberto Dini, the outgoing Prime Minister, along with former Christian Democrats, Liberals, Socialists, Republicans and Social Democrats. The party joined The Olive Tree centre-left coalition led by Romano Prodi. In the 1996 general election RI  gave hospitality in its electoral lists to the Italian Socialists (SI), the Segni Pact (PS) and the Democratic Italian Movement (MID). The Dini List won 4.3% of the vote, winning 26 seats at the Chamber:
10 Diniani (Dini, Augusto Fantozzi, Tiziano Treu, Natale D'Amico, Ernesto Stajano, Gianni Marongiu, Pierluigi Petrini, Andrea Guarino, Paolo Ricciotti, Lucio Testa);
8 PS (Diego Masi, Giuseppe Bicocchi, Elisa Pozza Tasca, Gianni Rivera, Antonino Mangiacavallo, Gianantonio Mazzocchin, Bonaventura Lamacchia, Paolo Manca);
7 SI (Enrico Boselli, Giuseppe Albertini, Enzo Ceremigna, Giovanni Crema, Leone Delfino, Sergio Fumagalli, Roberto Villetti);
1 MID (Aldo Brancati).

The list also won 11 seats at the Senate:
5 SI (Ottaviano Del Turco, Livio Besso Cordero, Giovanni Iuliano, Maria Rosaria Manieri, Cesare Marini);
4 Diniani (Mario D'Urso, Bianca Maria Fiorillo, Angelo Giorgianni, Adriano Ossicini);
1 PS (Carla Mazzuca Poggiolini);
1 MID (Giovanni Bruni).

After the election Dini became Minister of Foreign Affairs and Treu minister of Labour in the Prodi I Cabinet.

In 1998 the party was admitted into the European People's Party and at the 1999 obtained 1.1% of the vote and one MEP, Pino Pisicchio.

In October 2001 the party joined the Democracy is Freedom – The Daisy (DL), an electoral alliance of centrist parties which merged to become a unified party in March 2002. RI members in DL formed a faction within the party, named simply Renewal, consisting of around 10% of the party members. In 2007 several members of this association including Dini broke away from to form the Liberal Democrats upon DL's merger with the Democrats of the Left to form the Democratic Party.

Electoral results

Italian Parliament

European Parliament

Symbols

References

Political parties established in 1996
Political parties disestablished in 2002
Defunct political parties in Italy
Centrist parties in Italy
1996 establishments in Italy
2002 disestablishments in Italy
Liberal parties in Italy
[[Category:Pro-European political parties in Italy9]